SMS G7 was a V1-class large torpedo boat of the Imperial German Navy. She was built by the Germaniawerft shipyard at Kiel between 1911 and 1912, completing on 30 April 1912.

She served throughout the First World War, taking part in the Battle of Heligoland Bight on 28 August 1914, the Battle of Dogger Bank in 1915 and the Battle of Jutland in 1916.

Post war, G7 served in the Weimar Republic's Reichsmarine, and was modernised in 1928, when she was lengthened and re-armed. She continued to serve with Nazi Germany's Kriegsmarine and was renamed T107 in 1939.  The ship was used as a torpedo recovery vessel during the Second World War.  After the war, the ship was transferred to the Soviet Union as reparations, being renamed Porashayushtshiy before being scrapped in 1957.

Design and construction
In the first decade of the 20th century, the Imperial German Navy had generally ordered twelve large torpedo boats (Große Torpedoboote) as part of each year's construction programme, with a gradual evolution of design in each year's orders, with speed, range and seaworthiness improving year-on-year. These changes resulted in the ships becoming larger, and concerns grew that the torpedo boats were becoming too big to manoeuvre in and out of the battle fleet. For the 1911 fiscal year's orders, it was decided to revert to a smaller design, with the numbering system for torpedo boats restarting as a consequence. As was normal practice, that year's order was split between two shipyards, with six (V1–V6) to be built by AG Vulcan and six (G7–G12) by Germaniawerft, with detailed design differing between the two shipyards.

Displacement was  design and  full load.

The ship was armed with two 8.8 cm SK L/30 naval guns, one on the Forecastle and one aft. Four single 50 cm (19.7 in) torpedo tubes were fitted, with two on the ship's beam in the gap between the forecastle and the ship's bridge which were capable of firing straight ahead, and two on the ship's centreline aft of the funnels. 18 mines could be carried. The ship had a crew of 74 officers and men.

G7 was laid down at Germaniawerft's Kiel shipyard as yard number 170, was launched on 7 November 1911 and completed on 30 April 1912.

Modifications
In 1916, G7 had her guns replaced by 8.8 cm SK L/45 naval guns. In 1921 the 8.8 cm guns were replaced by two 10.5 cm L/45 guns and the ship's forecastle lengthened. From 1928 to 1931, the remaining Germaniawerft-built ships of the class (i.e. G7, G8, G10 and G11) were rebuilt at Wilhelmshaven. Displacement increased to  design and  full load. On conversion to a training role from 1936, the ship's forward gun was removed and her bridge enlarged. By 1944, armament was a single 10.5 cm gun mounted aft, with two 20 mm anti-aircraft guns.

Service
On commissioning, G7 joined the 10th Half Flotilla of V Torpedo Flotilla, and remained in that flotilla in 1914.

First World War
G7 was a member of the 10th Half Flotilla of V torpedo boat flotilla of the German High Seas Fleet on the outbreak of war. On 28 August 1914, the British Harwich Force, supported by light cruisers and battlecruisers of the Grand Fleet, carried out a raid towards Heligoland with the intention of destroying patrolling German torpedo boats. V Torpedo boat flotilla, including G7, together with four German light cruisers waited near Heligoland.

At about 06:00 on 28 August, the torpedo boat , one of the ships of the outer screen sighted the periscope of the British submarine , one of three submarines deployed as bait to lure the German torpedo boats away from Heligoland. G194 reported by radio her encounter with the British submarine to Rear Admiral Leberecht Maass, the commander of the German torpedo boat forces, aboard the cruiser  back at Wilhelmshaven. As a result of this report, the 5th Torpedo Boat Flotilla was ordered out to hunt the hostile submarine. At 07:57 G194 was fired on by British warships, and the outer screen was soon retreating towards Heligoland. The torpedo boats of V Flotilla were unaware of the approaching British surface force, and the leading ship of the flotilla,  came under fire by British light cruisers and destroyers. The flotilla turned south and headed for the cover of Heligoland's guns, but  lagged behind and was damaged by British shells before the arrival of the German light cruiser  allowed the Flotilla to escape. The torpedo boat  of the outer screen did not manage to evade the British force and was sunk. G7 was undamaged. On 13 October, G7 reported being unsuccessfully attacked by a submarine off the mouth of the Weser.

On 23 January 1915, the German 1st Scouting group under Admiral Franz von Hipper made a sortie to attack British fishing boats on the Dogger Bank. G7 sailed with V Flotilla as part of the German force. British Naval Intelligence was warned of the raid by radio messages decoded by Room 40, and sent out the Battlecruiser Force from Rosyth and the Harwich Force to intercept the German force.  The British and German Forces met on the morning of 24 January in the Battle of Dogger Bank. On sighting the British, Hipper ordered his ships to head south-east to escape the British, who set off in pursuit. The German light cruisers and torpedo boats steamed out ahead of the heavier ships, where they were not exposed to British fire, but the armoured cruiser , the oldest and slowest of Hipper's big ships, was disabled and fell back. Hipper considered sending his torpedo boats on a high risk daylight torpedo attack against the British, but an emergency turn by the British flagship, the battlecruiser  to avoid a non-existent German submarine, and misinterpretation of signals caused the British battlecruisers to concentrate on Blücher, already badly damaged and trailing well behind the other German ships, and allowing the rest of Hipper's fleet to escape, and causing Hipper to cancel the torpedo attack. Blücher was overwhelmed by British torpedoes and shellfire and sank.

G7 was part of the 10th half-flotilla of V Flotilla, which sailed in support of the German High Seas Fleet, at the Battle of Jutland on 31 May – 1 June 1916. From about 20:15 CET (19:15 GMT), the German torpedo boat flotillas launched a series of torpedo attacks against the British battle line in order to cover the German fleet's turn away from the British. First to attack were VI Flotilla and IX Flotilla, followed by III Flotilla. At 20:38, V Flotilla started an attack run, but it was unable to find the British battleline due to poor visibility caused by fog and smoke, and the attack was aborted. During the night action, V Flotilla was ordered to search for and attack the British fleet, but failed to encounter the British battleships. G7 was undamaged.

Between the wars
After the end of the First World War, the scuttling of the German High Seas Fleet at Scapa Flow on 21 June 1919 and the Treaty of Versailles left Germany with a small navy of obsolete warships.  The Versailles treaty limited the German Navy's torpedo forces to 16 destroyers and 16 torpedo boats, with only twelve of each in active service, with replacement of the existing ships not allowed until 15 years after they were launched. Replacements could not exceed 800 t displacement for destroyers and 200 t for torpedo boats. G7 was retained as a destroyer under the treaty, and remained in active service in the new Reichsmarine. Modernised in the late 1920s, G7 remained in active service when construction of the new Type 23 and 24 torpedo boats allowed many of the older boats to be retired or moved to subsidiary duties. G7 was part of the 1st Half Flotilla in 1932, and remained in active service in 1935. In 1936 G7 was allocated to training duties and on 23 April 1939 she was renamed T107.

Second World War
The outbreak of the Second World War in September 1939 brought at least a temporary return to active service, with T107 taking part with the destroyer Richard Beitzen in an anti-shipping patrol in the Kattegat on 12–14 September 1939. T107 was employed as a tender at the torpedo school and as a torpedo recovery vessel.

Post-war
Following the end of the war, G7 was transferred to the Soviet Union as a war prize, and was renamed Porashayushtshiy (Поражающий). She joined the Soviet Baltic Fleet, where she served until 28 November 1950. The ship was then disarmed and converted into an immobile training ship, being renamed Kazanka (Казaнка) on 22 December 1950. She was stricken on 12 March 1957 and then scrapped.

Notes

References

Bibliography

  

Torpedo boats of the Imperial German Navy
World War I torpedo boats of Germany
Ships built in Kiel
1911 ships